Mahadevappa Yashwantappa Rampure (1920-1973) was an Indian politician, freedom fighter who served as the Deputy Chairman of the Mysuru Legislative Council from 26 December 1956 to 31 March 1957. He was Member of the Lok Sabha for Kalaburagi Lok Sabha constituency from 5 April 1957 to 27 December 1970. He was the founder of Hyderabad Karnataka Education Society ( H.K.E. Society).

Early life and family 
Mahadevappa Rampure was born on  August 1, 1920, in Kumbari, Sholapur. Yashwantappa Rampure was his father. Completed his education from H.D. High School, Sholapur.

Personal life 
Mahadevappa Rampure was married to Smt. Taradevi and the couple had Five Son's and Three Daughters. He was Educationalist, Agriculturist, Businessman and Social worker by profession.

Political career 
Mahadevappa Rampure was Member and Deputy Chairman of Mysore Legislative Council in 1956. He was member of Second, Third and Fourth Lok Sabha. He was also member of Radical Democratic Party. He was General Secretary of Gulbarga District Congress for 8 years.

Positions held

Social activities

Social activities 
Organising study circles and Trade Unions.

Death 
Died due to the Heart Attack on Feb 6, 1973 in Bangalore.

References 

Members of the Mysore Legislature
1920 births
1973 deaths
India MPs 1962–1967
India MPs 1957–1962
Indian National Congress politicians from Karnataka